Boyunlu can refer to:

 Boyunlu, Kocaköy
 Boyunlu, Silvan